Cuzieu may refer to two Communes of France: 

Cuzieu, Ain 
Cuzieu, Loire